Gymnopilus ventricosus is a species of mushroom in the family Hymenogastraceae.  It was first described from the Stanford University campus by Franklin Sumner Earle as Pholiota ventricosa in 1902.

Description
The stalk is thick and bulbous, with a membranous ring. This species contains no psilocybin, and is considered inedible.

See also

List of Gymnopilus species

References

ventricosus
Fungi described in 1902
Fungi of North America
Inedible fungi
Fungi of California